This is a list of settlements in Cornwall by population based on the results of the 2011 census. The last United Kingdom census took place in 2021. In 2011, there were 19 built-up area subdivisions with 5,000 or more inhabitants in Cornwall, shown in the table below.

Parish counts take in wider areas than these urban areas and these are listed in the gallery section below.

Population ranking of built-up areas

Gallery of top 21 civil parishes by population 
The top civil parishes by population at the time of the United Kingdom Census 2011 with over 7,000 people. Some of these parishes form part of larger conurbations, the largest being Camborne/Carn Brea/Illogan/Redruth/Lanner/Carharrack/St Day, with 55,400. The second largest is St Austell/St Austell Bay/Carlyon/St Blaise/Tywardreath and Par, with 34,700 people. The third largest is Falmouth/Penryn/Mabe with 33,000.

See also 

 Cornwall
 Port Isaac

References 

Cornwall-related lists
Geography of Cornwall
Cornwall